Marisa De Aniceto (born 11 November 1986 in Luanda) is a French track and field athlete. She  competed at the 2012 Summer Olympics in the women's heptathlon event placing 21st.

Biographie 

In 2009, Marisa produced a score of 6080 points
to win the French 2009 National Championships at  Valence

In May 2012, Marisa De Aniceto won the track meet at Tenerife and raised her personal best to 6182 points, meeting the standard for qualifying for the London Olympics.

Prize List

Records

References

External links 

Biographie de l'athlète on the site of the Fédération française d'athlétisme

Living people
1986 births
Sportspeople from Luanda
French heptathletes
Angolan emigrants to France
Olympic athletes of France
Athletes (track and field) at the 2012 Summer Olympics